Mohammed A. Albakry is an Egyptian-American academic and translator of contemporary Arabic literature. He is currently a professor at Middle Tennessee State University. His translations of Arabic fiction appeared in various publications, and some of his translations of Egyptian drama have been performed in major U.S cities including theaters in New York, Boston, Nashville, and Chicago. He occasionally contributes journalistic pieces to The Tennessean newspaper, and other print and online periodicals.

References

External links
 Faculty profile in MTSU website: https://web.archive.org/web/20120910070644/http://www.mtsu.edu/english/Profiles/albakrym.php
 Short interview on “Out of the Blue”: https://www.youtube.com/watch?v=JFHIzwaIGyk
 Summer Scholars: National Endowment for the Humanities: University of Illinois: http://nehsummerinstitute.translation.illinois.edu/people/scholar
  An interview in Arabic (about 23 min) with Nile TV: https://www.youtube.com/watch?feature=c4-feed-u&v=jTMPlmn77RE
 National Endowment of the Arts profile—Writers’ Corner: http://arts.gov/writers-corner/bio/mohammed-albakry

See also
 List of Arabic-English translators

Living people
American people of Egyptian descent
American translators
Year of birth missing (living people)